The National Film Award for Best Children's Film is one of the National Film Awards presented annually by the Directorate of Film Festivals, the organisation set up by Ministry of Information and Broadcasting, India. It is one of several awards presented for feature films and awarded with Golden Lotus (Swarna Kamal).

The award was instituted in 1954, at 1st National Film Awards and awarded annually for children's films produced in the year across the country, in all Indian languages; Hindi (27 Awards), Bengali (7 Awards), Malayalam and Kannada (6 each), English (5 Awards), Marathi (3 Awards), Tamil, Telugu, Oriya and Assamese (1 each).

Winners 

Award includes 'Golden Lotus Award' (Swarna Kamal) and cash prize. Following are the award winners over the years:

References

External links 
 Official Page for Directorate of Film Festivals, India
 National Film Awards Archives
 National Film Awards at IMDb

Children's Film
Indian children's films